Eluned is a feminine given name and may refer to:

Saint Eluned, a 5th-century saint from Brecon, Wales
Eiluned Lewis (1900–1979), Welsh writer
Eluned Morgan (author) (1870–1938), Welsh-language author from Patagonia
Eluned Morgan, Baroness Morgan of Ely (born 1967), Welsh Labour member of the European Parliament
Eluned Parrott (born 1975), Welsh Liberal Democrat politician
Eluned Phillips (1914–2009), the only woman to win the bardic crown at the National Eisteddfod of Wales twice
Eluned Woodford-Williams (1913–1984), British geriatrician

See also
Luned, a variant of Eluned

References

Welsh feminine given names